A glossectomy is the surgical removal of all or part of the tongue. It is performed in order to curtail malignant growth such as oral cancer. Often only a portion of the tongue needs to be removed, in which case the procedure is called a partial removal, or hemiglossectomy.  A midline glossectomy is a surgical reduction of the size of the base of the tongue (posterior tongue), sometimes used to treat sleep apnea.

See also 
 List of surgeries by type

References

 
 

Surgical removal procedures
Tongue surgery